Yannan Subdistrict is a subdistrict in Yong'an, Fujian, China. , it administers the following nine residential neighborhoods and eight villages:
Neighborhoods
Taiping
Baxiwan
Nanta
Longling
Jiannan
Yimin
Wusi
Ma'an
Jiangjunshan Community

Villages
Nanjiao Village
Maoping Village
Yongjiang Village
Puling Village
Huangli Village
Guikou Village
Jifeng Village
Luoxi Village

See also 
 List of township-level divisions of Fujian

References 

Township-level divisions of Fujian
Yong'an